Khenifra (Berber: Xnifṛa, ⵅⵏⵉⴼⵕⴰ) is a city in northern central Morocco, surrounded by the Atlas Mountains and located on the Oum Er-Rbia River. National Highway 8 also goes through the town. The population, as of a 2019 census, was 228,567

History
Khenifra has been the Zayanes' central town for centuries. As such, it was an important military holding in the Zaian War. French General Paul Prosper Henrys had planned to lead the first attack on Khenifra on 10 June 1914. There would be three columns of troops, totaling up to 14,000 officers, to take Khenifra from the Zayanes control. One column was under Lieutenant-Colonel Henri Claudel, one under Colonel Gaston Cros, and one under Colonel Noël Garnier-Duplessix. Mouha ou Hammou Zayani led troops to attempt to stop the Khenifra campaign, but was eventually unsuccessful. The French took control of the town, but with losing around 600 men. In addition to leading the Zayanes, Hammou was responsible for much of the early 20th century development of Khenifra, having overseen the development of accommodations and mosques in the town.

Demography
Khenifra is inhabited by Zayanes, a Berber tribe, and the language spoken is a variety of Central Atlas Tamazight. The town population at the time of the 2019 census was 228,567.

Geography
Khenifra is located on the Oum Er-Rbia River National Highway 8 goes through Khenifra, and can provide travel to Marrakech and Fès. Jebel Bououzzal, "Iron Mountain", provides a source of iron, but its usefulness is limited due to also having a high sulphur content. Khenifra National Park is east of the town, and contains forests of Atlas cedars (Cedrus atlantica).

Sports
The best known sport was soccer; the team was created in 1943 under the name: "Khenifra Union Club", Then Chabab Atlas Khénifra. In addition to a men's team, the club established a women's squad on 30 November 1998.

Notable people 

Jaouad Gharib, former long-distance runner
Mohamed Rouicha, Moroccan singer and songwriter

References

Bibliography

Populated places in Khénifra Province
Khenifra